Poly(rC)-binding protein 1 is a protein that in humans is encoded by the PCBP1 gene.

This intronless gene is thought to have been generated by retrotransposition of a fully processed PCBP-2 mRNA. This gene and PCBP-2 have paralogues (PCBP3 and PCBP4) which are thought to have arisen as a result of duplication events of entire genes. The protein encoded by this gene appears to be multifunctional. It along with PCBP2 and HNRNPK corresponds to the major cellular poly(rC)-binding protein. It contains three K-homologous (KH) domains which may be involved in RNA binding. This encoded protein together with PCBP-2 also functions as translational coactivators of poliovirus RNA via a sequence-specific interaction with stem-loop IV of the IRES and promote poliovirus RNA replication by binding to its 5'-terminal cloverleaf structure. 

It has also been implicated in translational control of the 15-lipoxygenase mRNA, human Papillomavirus type 16 L2 mRNA, and hepatitis A virus RNA. The encoded protein is also suggested to play a part in formation of a sequence-specific alpha-globin mRNP complex which is associated with alpha-globin mRNA stability.

References

Further reading